Soulce-Cernay is a commune in the Doubs department' in the Bourgogne-Franche-Comté region in eastern France.

Geography

Population

Sights
 Jardin Paléobotanique

See also
 Communes of the Doubs department

References

External links

 Soulce-Cernay on the regional Web site 

Communes of Doubs